Sajmište can refer to:

Sajmište (Novi Sad), a neighborhood of Novi Sad, Serbia
Staro Sajmište, a neighborhood of Belgrade, Serbia
Sajmište concentration camp, a concentration camp from World War II